Sihăstria may refer to:
 Sihăstria, a tributary of the Negrișoara in Suceava County, Romania
 Sihăstrie, a tributary of the Vorona in Botoșani County, Romania